The Pratt & Whitney X-1800 (later enlarged as the XH-2600) was an H-block aircraft engine project developed between 1938 and 1940, which was cancelled with only one example being built.

Design and development

The X-1800 was a watercooled 24-cylinder H-block of 2,240 in3 displacement; this was later expanded to 2,600 in3 displacement. It was intended to be used in the Vultee XP-54, Curtiss-Wright XP-55 Ascender, Northrop XP-56, Lockheed XP-49, and Lockheed XP-58 Chain Lightning. Projected performance was to be 1,800 to 2,200 hp (1350-1640 kW), with a turbocharger to secure high-altitude performance. The designation came from the intended power rating rather than the more usual cubic inch engine displacement figure.

The target date for series production was 1942. In 1940, however, performance on the test bench did not continue to improve, demonstrating a need for considerable additional development effort. Pratt & Whitney subsequently ended development of the X-1800 in October 1940, with only one built, to concentrate on radial engines.

Intended applications
 Curtiss-Wright XP-55 Ascender
 Lockheed XP-49 
 Lockheed XP-58 Chain Lightning 
Northrop N-1
 Northrop XP-56
 Vultee XP-54

Specifications (X-1800)

See also

References

Notes

Bibliography

External links
 Photo of the XH-2600 at enginehistory.org

X-1800
Sleeve valve engines
1940s aircraft piston engines
Abandoned military aircraft engine projects of the United States